Stanley Bridge may refer to:

Stanley Bridge (EastEnders), fictional character
Stanley Bridge, a bridge in Stanley, Alexandria, Egypt
Stanley Bridge, Prince Edward Island, an unincorporated area, located in Queens County, Prince Edward Island, Canada